Acclaim Studios Manchester (formerly Software Creations) was a British video game developer based in Manchester, England. The company was established in 1985 by Richard Kay. They were primarily known for their video games based on movie and comic licences like Marvel Comics, Cutthroat Island, Disney's Beauty and the Beast and the original titles Plok, Solstice, and its sequel Equinox.

History 
According to Richard Kay, Software Creations began in 1986 when Steve Ruddy responded to an advertisement he had placed in the Manchester Evening News: 

Most of these early games were ports of budget titles to other platforms such as the Commodore 64, ZX Spectrum, Amiga, Atari ST, NES and the Game Boy. The company's breakthrough game was the Commodore 64 version of the arcade hit Bubble Bobble, a conversion which won critical acclaim and commercial success, and led to Software Creations being asked to do many more ports of popular arcade games. By this time the company had grown to include brothers Mike, Tim, and Geoff Follin, and artist Mark Wilson.

An early demo of Solstice won Software Creations a contract with Nintendo, leading to some high-profile NES and Super NES games.

During the early 1990s, Software Creations was responsible for the development of sound tools used in the creation of music for the Nintendo 64 and its development systems.

On 1 May 2002 Acclaim announced that they had acquired Software Creations, which was renamed Acclaim Studios Manchester. At the time, Software Creations had approximately 70 employees. Acclaim Studios Manchester was closed as part of Acclaim Studios and all of its development facilities on 27 August 2004. Rod Cousens and Barry Jafrato, who served as chief executive officer and head of publishing, respectively, for Acclaim, announced in September 2004 that they were planning to create as new video game publisher, Exclaim, with the help of Europlay Capital Advisers. Exclaim was set to acquire and reinstantiate Acclaim's two UK studios, namely Manchester and Cheltenham, and re-employ their roughly 160 previous members. Exclaim's opening was expected on 11 October, however, Cousen's ownership over the two studios was challenged by Acclaim's liquidator, Allan Mendelsohn, leaving the UK staff in a state of limbo. A successor to Acclaim Studios Manchester, SilverBack Studios, was founded by Jon Oldham in April 2005 and employed 15 former Acclaim Studios Manchester staff.

Games

References 

Defunct video game companies of the United Kingdom
Video game companies established in 1987
Video game companies disestablished in 2004
Defunct companies based in Manchester